The klivanion or klibanion was a Byzantine lamellar cuirass made of metal plates (scales or lamellae) sewn on leather or cloth, with plates protecting the shoulders and the back. It is said that the name derives from the Greek klivanos (κλίβανος), meaning "oven", because this cuirass tended to get unbearably hot when worn in the sun. It was part of the armour of the Byzantine heavy cavalry. This cavalry called the kataphraktoi also wore this with a thickly padded surcoat epilorikion as added covering. Considered one of the three best armors together the thorax and zava-lorikion, it was also worn by the Taghmatics and the Byzantine Imperial Guards.

Klivanion was also made for horses and this armor was made from bison hide.

References

External links 
Heath Ian,  McBride Angus (1979) Byzantine armies, 886-1118. Osprey Publishing Picture of a Byzantine icon of St. Theodore wearing a klivanion, p. 12.

Body armor
Byzantine military equipment